is a Japanese footballer currently playing as a left-back for Ventforet Kofu of J2 League as a designated special player.

Career statistics

Club
.

Notes

Honours

Club 
Ventforet Kofu
 Emperor's Cup: 2022

References

External links

1998 births
Living people
Japanese footballers
Meiji University alumni
Association football defenders
J2 League players
Ventforet Kofu players